Major Sir Robert Lister Bower   (12 August 1860 – 13 June 1929) was a British Army, colonial and police officer who served as Chief Constable of the North Riding of Yorkshire Constabulary from 1898 until his death in 1929.

Bower came from an old Yorkshire family; his father was Robert Hartley Bower of Welham Hall, Malton and his mother was a daughter of Sir John Lister-Kaye, 2nd Baronet of Denby Grange. Bower went to Harrow School in 1874 and was later commissioned into the Kerry Militia, from where he transferred to the King's Royal Rifle Corps in 1881. He served in the Anglo-Egyptian War and fought at Tel-el-Mahuta, Kassassin and Tel-el-Kebir. He also served in the 1884 Mahdist War, fighting at El Teb and Tamai, where he was mentioned in dispatches, and in the Nile Expedition of 1884–1885, being mentioned in dispatches twice more. In 1892 he served with the Jebu expedition in West Africa and from 1892 to 1893 he was Political Officer at Jebu Ode. From 1893 to 1897 he was British Resident at Ibadan, Nigeria, where he captured and arrested the Yoruba warrior Ogedengbe of Ilesa. For these services he was appointed Companion of the Order of St Michael and St George (CMG) in 1897.

In 1898 he was appointed Chief Constable of the North Riding of Yorkshire. He served in this role until his death, with a break in 1914–1916 when he returned to the Army as Deputy Assistant Adjutant-General in Egypt. He was appointed Commander of the Order of the British Empire (CBE) in the 1920 civilian war honours and was promoted to Knight Commander (KBE) in the 1925 Birthday Honours.

Bower died suddenly from heart failure brought on by pneumonia.

References
Obituary, The Times, 15 June 1929

1860 births
1929 deaths
People from Malton, North Yorkshire
People educated at Harrow School
King's Royal Rifle Corps officers
British Army personnel of the Mahdist War
British Army personnel of the Anglo-Egyptian War
British colonial political officers
British Chief Constables
Knights Commander of the Order of the British Empire
Companions of the Order of St Michael and St George
English recipients of the Queen's Police Medal
People from colonial Nigeria
History of Ibadan
British expatriates in Nigeria